The Dog River is a river in Mobile County, Alabama. It originates at  within the city of Mobile. It discharges into Mobile Bay, a tidal estuary on the northern Gulf of Mexico, at  near Hollinger's Island. It was named by the original French colonists as the Riviere Au Chien, which can be translated into English as Dog River.

Dog River is a brackish river - a mixture of fresh and saltwater. Also known to be a shallow river with the average depth at around 9–12 feet deep with some areas along the wetlands being only 1–2 feet at mid-tide.
There are both fresh and salt water fish species including bass, bream, mullet, redfish, croakers, speckled trout and flounder. Most land connected to the river is privately owned however there are several parks and public boat launch areas. Boaters can refuel at the marinas located at the river's mouth.

Major tributaries and sub-basins of the watershed include:

See also
List of Alabama rivers

References

External links
 Dog River Weather
 Alabama Water Watch
 Dog River Clear Water Revival

Rivers of Mobile County, Alabama
Rivers of Alabama
Tributaries of Mobile Bay